The Heart of Maryland is a lost 1921 American silent film feature produced and distributed by the Vitagraph Company of America. It is based on David Belasco's 1895 play, The Heart of Maryland.

When Warner Brothers acquired the Vitagraph Studios in 1925, they obtained the screen rights to this property and remade the story in 1927 as The Heart of Maryland with Dolores Costello.

Cast
Catherine Calvert as Maryland Calvert
Crane Wilbur as Alan Kendrick
Felix Krembs as Col. Fulton Thorpe
Ben Lyon as Bob Telfair
William Collier, Jr. as Lloyd Calvert
Warner Richmond as Tom Boone
Bernard Siegel as Provost-Sergeant Blount
Henry Hallam as General Kendrick
Victoria White as Nanny McNair
Marguerite Sanchez as Mrs. Claiborne
Jane Jennings as Mrs. Claiborne

See also
The Heart of Maryland (1915)

References

External links

1921 films
American silent feature films
Films directed by Tom Terriss
Lost American films
American films based on plays
Vitagraph Studios films
1921 drama films
Silent American drama films
American black-and-white films
Remakes of American films
1921 lost films
Lost drama films
1920s American films